Emre is a surname. Notable people with the surname include:

 Erhan Emre (born 1978), Turkish-German actor, director, producer, and writer
 Merve Emre, Turkish-American author, academic, and literary critic
 Yunus Emre (1238–1328), Turkish poet and mystic
Ahmet Cevat Emre (1876-1961) Turkish linguist

Turkish-language surnames